The  is a member of the Cabinet of Japan and is the leader and chief executive of the Ministry of Education, Culture, Sports, Science and Technology. The minister is nominated by the Prime Minister of Japan and is appointed by the Emperor of Japan.

The current minister is Keiko Nagaoka, who took office on 10 August 2022.

List of Ministers of Education, Culture, Sports, Science and Technology (2001–)

References

 
Culture ministers
Sports ministers
Japan